A kick is an attack using a foot, knee or leg.

Kick, Kicking, Kicks, or The Kick may also refer to:

Places
Kicking, Austria (disambiguation)

People
Kick (comedian) (born 1979), Japanese comedian and writer
Kick Gurry (born 1978), Australian actor
Cornelis Kick (1634 – 1681), Dutch painter
Russ Kick (born 1969), American writer, editor, and publisher
Simon Kick (1603–1652), Dutch painter

Art, entertainment, and media

Dancing
Kick (b-boy move), a move akin to a hand stand
Kick (dance move), a dance move

Films
Kick (1999 film), a film directed by Lynda Heys
Kick (2009 film), a Tollywood film starring Ravi Teja
Kick (2014 film), a Bollywood remake of the Telugu film starring Salman Khan
Kicks (film), Justin Tipping's directing debut
The Kick (film), a 2011 Thai-Korean martial arts film

Games
Kick (video game), a 1981 arcade game

Music
Kick, a bass drum played with a foot pedal
Kick, an integral element of Hardstyle, Hardcore Techno and similar genres

Albums
Kick (White Rose Movement album), 2006
Kick (INXS album), 1987, or the title song 
Kick, a 2019 album by Dave Hause
Kick, a 2022 compilation by Arca
 Kick I, a 2020 album by Arca
 Kick II, a 2021 album by Arca
 Kick III, a 2021 album by Arca
 Kick IIII, a 2021 album by Arca
 Kick IIIII, a 2021 album by Arca
Kicks (album), a 2009 album by 1990s
Kickin', a 1989 album by Rick James
Kickin, a 1988 album by The Brothers Johnson
Kickin, a 1975 album by Mighty Clouds of Joy
The Kick (album), a 2022 album by Foxes, or the title song

Songs
"Kick", a song by White Zombie from their 1987 EP Psycho-Head Blowout
"Kicks" (song), a 1966 song by Paul Revere & the Raiders
"Kicks", a song by Lights on her 2017 album Skin&Earth
"Kicks", a song by Lou Reed on his 1976 album Coney Island Baby
"The Kick", a 1963 song by The Capitols

Television
Kick (TV series), an Australian television series
Kick Buttowski: Suburban Daredevil, an American animated television series from 2010
Kicks, a TV movie starring Shelley Hack and Anthony Geary

Brands
Kick (soft drink), a citrus soft drink in North America
Kicks, a Beanie Baby bear produced in 1999
Kicks, or sneakers
Nissan Kicks, a sport utility vehicle model

Computing
KICK, a common Internet Relay Chat command to remove a person from a channel
CICS, pronounced "Kicks", a transaction server that runs primarily on IBM mainframe

Recoil
Kick, an attempt by an oil well being drilled to blowout
Kick, the recoil of a firearm

Sports
Kick (football), an action used in various forms of football
Kick (association football), kicking in the association (soccer) code of football
Kick (snooker), or kick shot, a type of shot in the game snooker
Kick, an attack in professional wrestling
Kick (running), a strong sprint at the finish of a race

See also
 KICK (disambiguation)
 Kiick, surname
 Kik (disambiguation)

Surnames from nicknames